The River Neb is one of the principal rivers on the Isle of Man.  It rises in the Michael hills, flows SW through Glen Helen (where it is joined by the Blaber River) to St John's, where it is joined by its principal tributary, the Foxdale River, and then flows NW to the Irish Sea at the town of Peel on the western coast.  The river gets a fine run of seatrout in the autumn.

The estuary of the river was the first known site of human settlement of the island, dating back 9,000 years.

References

Rivers of the Isle of Man